Lower Road Bridge is a historic structure located northwest of Anamosa, Iowa, United States. The King Iron Bridge and Manufacturing Co. of Cleveland erected a bowstring through arch truss and a shorter pony arch in 1878 for what was historically called Lower Road. The bridge's superstructure consists of a large stone masonry pier and abutments. It was listed on the National Register of Historic Places in 1998. The county abandoned the bridge and it is now privately owned.

See also
 
 
 
 
 List of bridges on the National Register of Historic Places in Iowa
 National Register of Historic Places listings in Jones County, Iowa

References

Bridges completed in 1878
Bridges in Jones County, Iowa
National Register of Historic Places in Jones County, Iowa
Road bridges on the National Register of Historic Places in Iowa
Truss bridges in Iowa
Relocated buildings and structures in Iowa
Through arch bridges in the United States
Bowstring truss bridges in the United States
1878 establishments in Iowa